The fourth season of Show dos Famosos premiered on September 5, 2021, at  on TV Globo.

It is the first season hosted by Luciano Huck and airing as a segment on Domingão com Huck, following Fausto Silva's departure from the network and, subsequently, the cancellation of Domingão do Faustão.

The season was originally expected to air in 2020, but production was postponed due to safety concerns resulting from the COVID-19 pandemic. The original cast were: Alexandre Pires, Barbara Fialho, Cleo, Diogo Vilela, Lexa, Margareth Menezes, Thiago Arancam and Vitor Kley. However, when production resumed in 2021, only Margareth, Thiago and Vitor still took part of the season.

Claudia Raia and Boninho returned as judges for their third and second seasons, respectively, while Miguel Falabella was replaced by Preta Gil. Xuxa, Angélica, Regina Casé and Juliana Paes filled in for Claudia as guest judges during the first four weeks of the show.

On December 26, 2021, Gloria Groove won the competition over Wanessa Camargo, Vitor Kley and Robson Nunes, thus becoming the first drag artist to win the show.

Cast

Elimination chart

Key

Weekly results

Week 1
Group A – Round 1
 Guest judge: Xuxa

Week 2
Group B – Round 1
 Guest judge: Angélica

Week 3
Group C – Round 1
 Guest judge: Regina Casé

Week 4
Group A – Round 2
 Guest judge: Juliana Paes

Week 5
Group B – Round 2

Week 6
Group C – Round 2

Week 7
Group A – Round 3

Week 8
Group B – Round 3

Week 9
Group C – Round 3

Week 10
Group B – Elimination

Week 11
Group A – Elimination

Week 12
Group C – Elimination

Week 13
Semifinals – Round 1

Week 14
Semifinals – Round 2

Week 15
Semifinals – Elimination

Week 16
Finals

References

External links
Domingão com Huck on Gshow.com

2021 Brazilian television seasons
Television productions postponed due to the COVID-19 pandemic